The Kundby case was a 2016 plan to bomb two schools in Denmark, including a Jewish school in Copenhagen. The plan was made by a 15-year-old Danish girl from Kundby, Denmark who had converted to Islam and became an enthusiastic supporter of jihad and of ISIS. The police found chemicals to create a bomb in her home in Kundby.

Background 
A 15-year-old Muslim girl planned to build a bomb to blow up two schools in Denmark: Sydskolen in Fårevejle (near Holbæk), which she previously attended, and Carolineskolen, a Jewish school in Copenhagen. The plotter was 17 at the time of her trial. An American captain from Iraq warned Denmark, which led to detention of the girl and a 24-year-old Turkish man. The plotter, a recent convert to Islam, wrote on her Facebook page of her desire to help convert more Danish people to Islam and joined a Facebook page of ISIS supporters. She is described as having undergone a rapid transformation, changing within a few months from a teenager interested in clothes and boys, into a young woman interested in fighting a holy war. She told the court that she became interested because Islamist ideas and ISIS were "exciting".

The Turkish man was not charged in the Kundby plot due to insufficient evidence against him, but in early 2017, when 25 years old, he received a prison sentence, lost his Danish citizenship (he had been a dual national of Turkey and Denmark) and was banned for life from visiting Denmark after being convicted of joining the terror organization ISIS during trips to Syria. He was only the second person to lose his Danish citizenship due to terror-related charges.

History

Arrest and detention 
On 13 January 2016 police found bomb-making chemicals in the home of the plotter on Trønningevej in Kundby. She had not succeeded in making a bomb. The plotter was arrested at 12:22 CET. The court in Holbæk placed her in pre-trial detention.

Legal proceedings 
On 17 February 2017, charges of terrorism were levied against the girl. She was further charged with violence after she stabbed a pedagogue in the stomach with a glass splinter from a mirror while in detention. The public prosecutor demanded she be held in custody indefinitely.

The case started on 19 April 2017. The judgement on the issue of guilt was moved to 16 May 2017 after police found a letter in her prison cell from a man convicted of terrorism. She was sentenced to six years in prison on 18 May 2017.

The public prosecutor appealed the sentence, demanding a custodial sentence without a definite time limit, stating she was too dangerous to be part of society. Retslægerådet (Danish Justice Physician Council) agreed with the public prosecutors.

See also 
 Terrorism in Europe
 Islamic terrorism in Europe
 List of terrorist incidents in Denmark

References 

21st-century attacks on synagogues and Jewish communal organizations
Antisemitism in Denmark
Failed terrorist attempts in Denmark
Islamic terrorism in Denmark
Terrorist incidents in Europe in 2016